A referendum was held in the Northern Territory on Saturday, 3 October 1998, to decide whether the Territory should become a State of the Commonwealth of Australia. The Country Liberal Party government, and its federal counterpart, supported the Yes case. The opposition Labor Party supported the No case.

The referendum was narrowly defeated, 51.9% to 48.1%. The "Yes" case received 44,702 votes, the "No" case 48,241. There were 1068 invalid ballots.

The result was widely interpreted as a personal rebuke to then Chief Minister Shane Stone. Polls suggest that most of the people living in the Northern Territory continue to support statehood for the territory in principle.

The failed referendum has been seen as the trigger for the demise of the CLP government which had been in power since 1974.

In February 1999, months after the failed referendum, Stone resigned as Chief Minister before his colleagues had a chance to dump him with the failed referendum being the trigger for his ousting.

He was replaced by Denis Burke who then led the CLP to defeat in 2001 election marking the end of 27 years of CLP rule.

Background

The territory has a legislative assembly. Whilst this assembly exercises roughly the same powers as the governments of the states of Australia, it does so by delegation of powers from the commonwealth government, rather than by any constitutional right.  For several years there has been agitation for full statehood.

Under the Australian Constitution, the Federal government may set the terms of entry to full statehood. The Northern Territory was offered three Senators, rather than the twelve guaranteed to original states.  (Because of the difference in populations, equal numbers of Senate seats would mean a Territorian's vote for a Senator would have been worth more than 30 votes in New South Wales or Victoria.) Alongside what was cited as an arrogant approach adopted by then Chief Minister Shane Stone, it is believed that most Territorians were reluctant to adopt the offer which was made.

A bipartisan NT Legislative Assembly Committee, chaired by former Chief Minister Stephen Hatton, had proposed a draft Constitution and that it should be debated at an elected Constitutional Convention. Shane Stone ignored the latter recommendation, nominating a Convention membership of 53 members at short notice, and then presented to the Convention a draft Constitution that was different from the Committee's recommendation. Stephen Hatton later said "one of the campaign slogans at the time was, we want statehood, not Stonehood".

References

1998 elections in Australia
1998 referendums
Referendums in the Northern Territory
1990s in the Northern Territory
October 1998 events in Australia